Leo Li (born 27 July 1993) is a Chinese actress, singer-songwriter and television presenter. She is famous for her photo album with her alma mater - Yali, I Will Marry You Today in 2013.

Biography 
Li was born to an ethnic Tujia family in Changsha, Hunan province in 1993. After graduation from Yali High School, she entered into Wuhan University and graduated in 2015. While a student at Wuhan University, she published her photo album with her alma mater - Yali, I Will Marry You Today. Since its release in 2013, it has become famous quickly on the Internet. In 2015, she joined Hunan Broadcasting System and became a television presenter. In 2016, she recorded her first single "Little Shrimp". It was released on July 27, 2017. In 2017, she starred her first TV drama Kiss Love and Taste and started her acting career. Later she acted her first film Fantasy Metamorphoses.

Filmography

Films

Micro films

Television series

As host

Variety shows

Discography

Singles

Soundtrack appearances

Collaborations

Songwriting credits

Music videos

Theater

References

External links 

 
 

1993 births
Living people
Actresses from Changsha
21st-century Chinese actresses
Chinese film actresses
Chinese television actresses
Singers from Hunan
21st-century Chinese women singers
Chinese Mandopop singers
Mandopop singer-songwriters
Chinese women television presenters
Wuhan University alumni